Fruitcake is a traditional cake made with chopped fruits and nuts.

Fruitcake may also refer to:

 Fruitcake (film), an upcoming film by director John Waters
 Fruitcake (album), a 1996 album by Filipino band Eraserheads and its title track
 Fruitcake (EP), an EP by Eraserheads
 Fruitcakes (album), a 1994 album by Jimmy Buffett
 "Fruitcake", a song by Stone Sour from  Come What(ever) May
 Fruitcake (song), by The Superions from Destination... Christmas!
 Fruitcake, progressive rock band from Norway, active in the 90s-00s
 Fruitcake, a person alleged to suffer from insanity
 Fruit (slang), a gay man or LGBT person

See also
 Christmas cake, a type of fruitcake served at Christmas time in the UK, Ireland, Japan, Philippines and many Commonwealth countries